Life in the Country (Swedish: Livet på landet) is a 1943 Swedish historical comedy film directed by Bror Bügler and starring Edvard Persson, George Fant and Birgitta Valberg. It is based on the 1862 German novel From My Farming Days by Fritz Reuter, which had previously been adapted into the 1924 Swedish silent film Life in the Country.

The film's sets were designed by the art director Max Linder.

Cast
 Edvard Persson as Zakarias Bräsig
 George Fant as Frans von Rambow
 Bror Bügler as Axel von Rambow
 Birgitta Valberg as Frida von Rambow
 Ivar Kåge as Carl Haverman
 Ingrid Backlin as Louise Haverman
 Willy Peters as Fritz
 Mim Persson as Marie Möller
 Kolbjörn Knudsen as Carl Brockman
 Dagmar Ebbesen as Mrs. Brockman
 Birgitta Arman as Salla Brockman
 Nancy Dalunde as Malla Brockman
 Sven Bergvall as Reverend Berger
 Gull Natorp as Mrs. Berger
 Albert Ståhl as Brolin
 John Ericsson as Anders
 John Norrman as Night-watchman
 Robert Johnson as Auctioneer
 Georg Fernqvist as Daniel

References

Bibliography 
 Goble, Alan. The Complete Index to Literary Sources in Film. Walter de Gruyter, 1999.
 Qvist, Per Olov & von Bagh, Peter. Guide to the Cinema of Sweden and Finland. Greenwood Publishing Group, 2000.

External links 
 

1943 films
1940s historical comedy films
Swedish historical comedy films
1940s Swedish-language films
Films directed by Bror Bügler
Swedish black-and-white films
Films based on German novels
Films set in the 19th century
German historical films
1940s Swedish films